Sekolah Menengah Jenis Kebangsaan Seg Hwa, shortened SMJK Seg Hwa is a national-type public high school located at Jalan Tahang Rimau, District of Segamat,  Johor, Malaysia.

The school is well known for its symbolic clock tower, gigantic stone steps, Chinese pavilions and non-functional water fountain .

The clock tower, "Xi Yin Lou 惜阴楼", was a gift from the school 11th alumni. It was built in 1962 with an engraving of a famous Chinese poem by Tao Qian (陶渊明) from the Jin Dynasty:

"盛年不重来，一日难再晨; 及时当勉励，岁月不待人。"

History

In 1918, some local merchants with the co-operation of the local Chinese set up a primary school named Chong Cheng Primary School (now known as Sekolah Jenis Kebangsaan (Cina) Seg Hwa, Chinese:昔华国民型华文小学) along Jalan Mentol, Segamat. With financial contributions from the local Chinese merchants, a new building with eight classrooms was constructed in 1936.

After the Second World War, the school was renamed "Hwa Chiao Primary and Secondary School" (Sekolah Menengah Rendah Hwa Chiao) with the establishment of a secondary school section.

Due to the increasing student population, a new block of 10 classrooms was put up in 1950. However, it did not solve the shortage of classrooms. The Board of Governors of the school set up a building committee in 1954 with the assistance of the Association of Rubber Merchants.

The Building Committee proposed an alternative site for construction of the secondary school building. With the assistance of the then local assemblyman, YB Tuan Haji Noor, the school successfully applied for a piece of land approximately  near Bukit Hampar (where the school is now situated) from the Government of Johor.

A new block of 16 classrooms was constructed at the new site. The secondary school was officially separated from Hwa Chiao Primary and Secondary School and named as Sekolah Menengah Hwa Chiao, Bukit Hampar (Tahang Rimau). The primary school remains at Jalan Mentol. The first school session at the new site started in 1957.

From the establishment until 1957, the school was running with private funding and donations from the locals. With the independence of the Federation of Malaya and in line with national policy, the Board of Governors agreed to accept the government funding and assistant for the administration of the school. It was renamed Hwa Chiao National Type Secondary School (Sekolah Menengah Jenis Kebangsaan Hwa Chiao) with the appointment of Tseng Hsi Kuei as Principal.

Due to the shortage of classrooms, the school operated in two sessions per day i.e. morning for upper secondary and afternoon for lower secondary from 1959.

In 1963, the Board of Governors of the school felt that the name "Hwa Chiao" was no longer appropriate as it carries the meaning of "Chinese abroad" while most of the Chinese in Malaya has been granted citizenship. The school was renamed "Seg Hwa National Type Secondary School" (Sekolah Menengah Jenis Kebangsaan Seg Hwa). "Seg Hwa" means "the Chinese of Segamat".

School motto

自强不息 厚德载物
"Usaha Asas Kejayaan" 
(English translation: Self-discipline and Social Commitment)
(English translation: faith on oneself, success with virtue)

The school motto in Chinese is the same as Tsinghua University (Chinese:清华大学), which is originated from I Ching (Chinese:《易经》) which quote:

 "天行健，君子以自强不息。地势坤，君子以厚德载物。"

School anthem

山色苍苍，河水泱泱

唯吾雄伟昔华，矗立柔佛北方
 
神州声教，广披炎荒 

陶冶沟通，斯文以光

咨尔多士同聚一堂，好学力行，美德竞扬

日新月异不惜自强

大哉昔华悠久无疆。

Students' life

Provision Form

Provision Form students study in the morning session. There is only two classes in each year.

Lower Secondary Form

First - Third Form are the lower form. Students of First & Second Form are in the afternoon session. Third Form students study on the morning session. Third Form students usually take Lower Secondary Assessment Test examinations at the end of the year.

Upper Secondary Form

The upper forms are Fourth and Fifth Form. All are in the morning session. The upper form classes is divided into Science stream and Art Stream. It has 4 to 5 classes of Science stream and 4 to 5 classes of Art stream in each form. The Fifth form students take Malaysian Certificate of Education examinations at the end of the year.

Sixth Form (Pre-University)

Sekolah Menengah Seg Hwa started its pre-university class (Science stream) in 2006. However, only two class was allocated; one  upper six and the other lower six by the Education Department. The Sixth Formers (Pre-University) will have to study one and a half years before taking Malaysian Higher School Certificate examinations.

All sixth formers are members of the Pre-University Student Representatives Council (Malay: Majlis Perwakilan Pelajar-Pelajar Pra-Universiti). Its main annual activities include orientation week for new Lower Sixth formers, field trip, graduation night and other co-curricular activities.

School facilities

Sports stadia

Festing stadium

In 1959, the then principal Tseng Hsi Kuei with the assistance of his former colleague General Festing, cleared  of unused land of the school and converted the same into a sport stadium. The stadium was named after the General as "Festing Stadium". The stadium is now being used as football field.

Woo Seng Hwa Sports Stadium

In 2006, with the assistance of the Chinese community in the district of Segamat, a sports stadium is being constructed. This stadium is used as badminton courts, exhibition halls and other purposes. This stadium is named after the former Principal of the school Woo Seng Hwa.

Libraries
The old library, named "Woo Seng Hwa Library", is now for lower form secondary students usage. The library is for the students to study, read, borrow reading materials and use media like electronic dictionary and radios. In 2008, a new library was set up for the usage of Upper Secondary students as well as Sixth Formers.

Science laboratories
In 2007, new science laboratories for the Sixth Formers and Upper Secondary Science students were set up. The science labs include Physics, Chemistry and Biology Laboratories.

School Anniversaries

Silver Jubilee
The school celebrated its silver jubilee in 1982 with a funfair and exhibitions. The then Deputy Minister of Education YB Tan Tiong Hong officially opened the new school three-storey science labs. A fund raising dinner was also organised.

Golden Jubilee
The school celebrated its golden jubilee on the 21 and 22 July 2001. The celebration was attended by the then Deputy Education Minister, Dato' Hon Choon Kim. The school also held a fund raising dinner attended by 3000 guests.

Academic Achievements

The school has many "straight A" students in the Lower Secondary Assessment Test, Malaysian Certificate of Education. In 2008, the school was awarded "Pencapaian Perfect A Tertinggi" in the Segamat district by Segamat District Education Department for the 2007 SPM exam.

For Malaysian Higher School Certificate, the school get its first result on 2008. The school reach its target of 100% pass on the examinations. Two students got straight As in the 2007 Malaysian Higher School Certificate exam. The Johor state Education Department awarded the school "Sekolah Cemerlang Negeri Johor" (Preeminence School in Johor) for the 2007 STPM exam.

The recent announced 2008 SPM result, the school was ranked Third place in Johor state. Three students get 13A, ten students get 12A and eleven students get 11A. Amongst, 6 students get straight A1s in the exam.

Since the establishment of Sixth Form (Science), the school achieved 100% passes in the STPM examinations.

Co-curricular achievements

In 2009, the school's sport team won the grand championship of the 38th MSSM Sports Championship district of Segamat (Kejohanan Olahraga MSSM Segamat).

References

External links
 SMJK Seg Hwa website

Schools in Johor
Secondary schools in Malaysia
1951 establishments in Malaya
Educational institutions established in 1951
Chinese-language schools in Malaysia